Keng-Jylga is a village in the Osh Region of Kyrgyzstan. It is part of the Alay District. Its population was 2,709 in 2021.

References

Populated places in Osh Region